Global storm activity of 2008 profiles the major worldwide storms, including blizzards, ice storms, and other winter events, from January 1, 2008 to December 31, 2008. A winter storm is an event in which the dominant varieties of precipitation are forms that only occur at cold temperatures, such as snow or sleet, or a rainstorm where ground temperatures are cold enough to allow ice to form (i.e. freezing rain). It may be marked by strong wind, thunder and lightning (a thunderstorm), heavy precipitation, such as ice (ice storm), or wind transporting some substance through the atmosphere (as in a dust storm, snowstorm, hailstorm, etc.). Major dust storms, Hurricanes, cyclones, tornados, gales, flooding and rainstorms are also caused by such phenomena to a lesser or greater existent.

A storm (from Proto-Germanic *sturmaz "noise, tumult") is any disturbed state of an astronomical body's atmosphere, especially affecting its surface, and strongly implying severe weather. It may be marked by strong wind, thunder and lightning (a thunderstorm), heavy precipitation, such as ice (ice storm), or wind transporting some substance through the atmosphere (as in a dust storm, snowstorm, hailstorm, etc.).

Storms are created when a centre of low pressure develops, with a system of high pressure surrounding it. This combination of opposing forces can create winds and result in the formation of storm clouds, such as the cumulonimbus. Small, localized areas of low pressure can form from hot air rising off hot ground, resulting in smaller meteorological disturbances such as dust devils and whirlwinds.

Events of 2008

January

December 30, 2007 – January 2, 2008

A series of moderate to intense low pressure systems affected most of eastern North America particularly the Canadian Maritimes with repeated heavy snow, mixed precipitation, rain and wind. The initial storm dumped over a foot of snow over parts of Newfoundland and Labrador on December 30 while a second storm gave a foot of snow over Prince Edward Island and several inches of snow across New Brunswick and portions of New England and Ontario on December 30–31 while Nova Scotia received a mix of snow, rain and ice pellets. Several New Year's Eve festivities including Charlottetown's main event as well as the fireworks show in St. John's were cancelled due to weather conditions.

As part of a third storm, a burst of snow, some of it lake enhanced, affected The Great Lakes from mid-afternoon New Year's Eve until mid-afternoon New Year's Day. Detroit Metropolitan Airport and Chicago-O'Hare International Airport both reported numerous delays and 145 flights were canceled at O'Hare alone. There were no serious injuries or fatalities reported, but many spinouts and other accidents occurred.

January 2–3
A major winter storm event took place across portions of central Europe including Bulgaria, Ukraine, Romania and southwestern Russia as well as areas near the Black Sea. The storm was responsible for the sinking of the M/S Vanessa, a Bulgarian cargo ship on the Kerch Strait, killing at least 4 sailors. Electricity was also cut in about 300 towns and villages in Bulgaria and deliveries of food and water were also delayed.

January 3–11

Heavy snow fell in the Sierra Nevada and Cascade mountains from three storms. The heaviest snow occurred in the mountains south of Lake Tahoe, with Kirkwood Mountain Resort receiving  of snow. Snow depths of at least  were widely reported. The snow was combined with wind gusts exceeding , creating blizzard and white-out conditions in the Sierra Nevada. Widespread reports of 3–6 inches of rain were received, and at the height of the storm approximately 2 million people were without power in California. About 3,000 people in Orange County, California were forced to evacuate their homes because of mudslide concerns in areas that had recently been burned in wildfires. These storms continued through the Intermountain West and into the Rocky Mountains. Heavy snow of 2–4 feet occurred in the San Juan Mountains of Colorado, with a maximum of  reported at the Silverton Mountain Resort. Six snowmobilers who were stranded by the storm in southern Colorado found shelter in a cabin. However, 3 people were still missing; one hiker in the San Bernardino Mountains in southern California, and two skiers in Colorado near Wolf Creek Pass. At least three people were confirmed killed in the storm. A woman died when she drove her car across a flooded road in Chino, California, one person was killed by a falling branch in Sacramento, and person was killed by a falling tree in Central Point, Oregon. Two bodies discovered in Sacramento near a homeless camp were also being investigated as possibly weather-related. In southeastern Utah, nine people were killed and 20 injured after a charter bus returning from a ski trip in Telluride, Colorado ran off the road north of Mexican Hat. However, it was unknown if slick roads were the primary cause of the crash.

January 5–7
A major snowstorm that dropped the heaviest snow in more than a decade in northern Iran killed at least 21 people and injured at least 88, with some people freezing to death, others dying in avalanches, and some dying after their cars overturned on snow-covered roads. "Heavy" sea-effect snow also fell in Baku, Azerbaijan.

January 13–14

A Nor'easter developed along the Mid-atlantic coast, and moved northward. It affected the northeastern United States, eastern Quebec and the Canadian Maritimes with heavy snow, and high winds along the coast.

January 17–18
A low pressure system moving northward up the East Coast caused snow and rain to overspread the Mid-Atlantic region on January 17 and 18. Many spots started off as snow, with a gradual changeover to sleet, freezing rain and then finally rain as the storm slowed down. The greatest concern for accumulating ice was in western North Carolina, while the greatest accumulations of snow was expected in the Shenandoah Valley. Lighter accumulations of snow were expected along and west of I-95 in the Baltimore-Washington metro area, making for a difficult commute that afternoon. Winter storm watches and warnings extended from northern Georgia into southern Pennsylvania.

The wintry mix continued to spread northward overnight and into Friday. While New York and Boston saw mainly rain, accumulating snow occurred through the upper Delaware Valley and into the Hudson River Valley. The heaviest snow on Friday was expected for northern New Hampshire into Maine.

January 24–31
A rapid-fire series of major winter storms affected the western United States over the last week of January. The storms focused on California at first, bringing heavy rain and snow to the state. The heaviest rains occurred around Santa Barbara. Many areas of southern California received more rain during these storms than what they saw the entire previous water year. Heavy snow periodically closed Interstate 5 over the Grapevine (north of Los Angeles) due to the snow, as well as jackknifed tractor trailers, which stranded about 300 motorists for several hours. Heavy snow pounded all of the mountains of California, and 3 skiers were killed by avalanches on January 24 in the San Gabriel Mountains, where locally  of snow fell in the storm. Several mudslides and flash floods were reported in Orange County and in Los Angeles, while several residents were forced to be evacuated from their homes in Marin County. A Metrolink commuter train in Los Angeles hit mud and rocks that partially covered the tracks, causing it to be stranded along with its hundreds of passengers for over 2 hours before another train pulled it out from the debris. Wind gusts of 40–50 mph also affected areas of southern California. Combined with the heavy wind and rain in the region, widespread though spotty power cuts were reported.

Heavy snow also spread into the Inland Empire of the Pacific Northwest. This storm caused numerous roofs to collapse near Coeur d'Alene. Lewiston, Idaho recorded  inches, Pendleton, Oregon , and Spokane an additional . Numerous roads throughout the Spokane Valley, the Palouse, and the surrounding mountains were closed at various times during the storms. Several inches of snow even fell in Seattle and down to the Oregon coast (a very rare event). Interstate 90 over Snoqualmie Pass, which had seen snowfall approaching , was hit by two avalanches in 3 days, the second of which buried 2 cars.

The mountains of Utah and Colorado also saw heavy snow of 2–4 feet during this time.

January 29

A major snowfall event affected portions of the Middle East including Israel, Jordan, Syria and Lebanon. The main highway between Tel Aviv and Jerusalem was also shortly closed because of the snow. The weather event had topped local headlines eclipsing a critical government report related to the 2006 Lebanon War and Israeli Prime Minister Ehud Olmert.

February

January 10 – February 5

Several days of heavy wet snow, frigid temperatures and ice struck several regions of central China during the country's peak Lunar New Year Travel Season. At least 107 people were killed by the storm which stranded several thousands of people, canceled numerous flights and damaged or destroyed several homes, power lines and crops which had raised concerns for food and water shortage a. Among the fatalities, 11 were killed by a bus accident in Anhui with flipped into a ditch on January 21.

The provinces of Hubei, Henan, Shandong, Jiangsu and Anhui were the hardest hit areas where some areas received their worst snow storm in 50 years. Snow persisted throughout the week with bitterly cold temperatures accompanying it. Tens of thousands of people were left stranded at several trains stations across southern China including Guangzhou Several main highways which also disrupted transportation of goods across several areas of the country.

Widespread power cuts were also reported and at one point, 17 of the 31 provinces had to endured reduced power supplies. It was estimated that about 827 000 people were evacuated across 14 provinces. The country's civil affairs ministry estimated that the severe weather affected 67 million people and that the costs were estimated at about 7.8 billion British pounds, 15.8 billion US Dollars or 111 billion Chinese yuan.

January 27 – February 2

A series of low pressure systems affected the eastern portion of North America with various types of weather. Particularly hard hit was Prince Edward Island where about one-third of the island lost power while numerous power poles and lines were downed due to the weight of the ice. Canadian Defense Minister Peter MacKay offered the province help with the services of the Canadian Armed Forces.

Meanwhile, another powerful storm moved across much of the continent, bringing first blizzard conditions and frigid temperatures from Alberta to Manitoba and down towards the Dakotas where temperatures dropped locally 40 degrees below zero with much colder windchills. While approaching the eastern half of the continent, it intensified further and brought widespread damage wind some of them from thunderstorms. Winds exceeded locally as much as 120 km/h in some areas while blowing snow shut down many roads near the shorelines of Georgian Bay and Lake Huron. The cold front associated with the depression produced very rapid temperature drops in a short period from Iowa to southern Ontario. The storm killed at least two in Indiana due to an EF2 tornado.

A third strong storm developed across the Texas Panhandle on January 31 and affected much of the Midwest and East with heavy snows from Northern Oklahoma to Quebec with significant ice across the Appalachians and the Ohio Valley and severe weather from southern Texas to the Middle Atlantic States. Chicago saw its largest snowstorm this season as it dropped over ten inches (203 mm)  of snow in downtown, building up traffic delays. It also brought severe weather to the deep south bringing several inches of rain. The storm also produced heavy sleet and freezing rain in much of Pennsylvania and New York. The highest reported amount of ice accumulation was at State College, Pennsylvania, where  of ice fell, coupled with moderate wind gusts, caused downed trees and powerlines there, and in much of the Northeast United States. The ice then moved into the Canadian Maritimes for several hours. While it disrupted air travel at various major airports along the path, the storm was responsible for at least 15 deaths across three states and one Canadian province including one in Ontario, four in New York, six in Illinois, three in Texas and one in Oklahoma.

February 5–6

A major winter storm affected the Central United States and southern Ontario from February 5 into February 6. The storm stretched from Wisconsin all the way south into Mississippi. Many places throughout northern Illinois and southern Wisconsin were forced to close on February 6, including schools, colleges, churches, health care centers, government buildings, businesses, and shopping malls. In addition, over 1000 flights were canceled at Chicago-O'Hare International Airport and 100 at Chicago-Midway International Airport while numerous flights were also cancelled at Toronto's Pearson International Airport. In the Milwaukee area, whiteout conditions forced the temporary closure of General Mitchell International Airport, where half of its flights were canceled for the day. In addition, numerous accidents were reported across the area, including one fatality. Several interstates and other roadways were closed throughout Wisconsin due to either whiteout conditions or accidents. The National Guard was brought in to assist over 2000 stranded motorists on a  stretch of I-90 between Janesville, WI, and Madison after several semi trailers lost traction and blocked the road.

The same storm system brought heavy rain across portions of the Ohio Valley, with severe thunderstorms further south. Kentucky, Arkansas, Tennessee, Mississippi, and Alabama all saw tornadoes from mid-afternoon February 5 to the early morning hours of February 6. 33 people were killed in Tennessee, 14 in Arkansas, 7 in Kentucky, and 5 in Alabama. In all, at least 59 people have been killed by the tornadoes, making it the deadliest outbreak since the 1985 United States-Canadian tornado outbreak of 1985, which killed 88 people. In addition, over 100 people have been injured. The storm tore off the roof of a shopping mall in Memphis, trapped college students at Union University in Jackson, Tennessee, ignited a gas fire near Nashville, and demolished warehouses in Southaven, Mississippi, in addition to destroying numerous homes. Over 103 separate tornadoes were reported. Several presidential candidates paused to remember victims during their speeches after the Super Tuesday primaries, with several tornadoes still occurring as they were speaking.

February 12–14
On February 11, a low pressure system moved out of the U.S. Plain States into the eastern half of the United States and eastern Canada. The low pressure system began to strengthen, and slowly moved east. Snow began to fall in on the northern side of the system as the storm moved off the coast. It all but stalled, and the snow soon turned to ice for most of the affected area. After the ice storm, temperatures warmed to above freezing, and most of the precipitation turned to all rain for all areas other than the far northern fringes of the storm. The rain lasted for several hours in many places, with some areas receiving  of rain, which caused minor flooding in low-lying and urban areas. As the primary low pressure system moved away, a smaller low formed, which enhanced rainfall and extended precipitation for several more hours. By early on February 14, the storm had moved away. On the northern side of the system between 10–20 cm of snow fell from Wisconsin to New Brunswick.

February 17–18 
A panhandle hook winter storm combined with an Alberta clipper crossed the central United States, spreading rain, ice and heavy snow to parts of the upper Midwest and Northeast as well as eastern Canada from southern Manitoba to the Canadian Maritimes. Portions of Iowa and Manitoba were under blizzard warnings. Areas from northern Ontario to southern Wisconsin were under winter storm warnings while much of Ontario and Quebec were under freezing rain warnings. The ice event may have been blamed for a late-evening incident at the Ottawa International Airport where a Boeing 737 WestJet flight from Calgary slid off an icy runway and ending off into a snowbank. No injuries among the 94 passengers and crew members were reported in the incident.

The system was also notable for a tornado outbreak across Alabama, Georgia and Florida where dozens of tornadoes touched down injuring at least 30.

February 17–18 

Heavy snowfall in Greece cut off access to at least 150 villages and was followed by a major cold snap. Significant power outages and water supply shortages were reported across many areas. Hardest hit areas were the island of Crete and Evia as well as the southern portions of the Peloponnese Peninsula. In Athens, where at least  fell, dozens of flights from the Athens Airport were cancelled while most schools throughout the city were shut down.

February 21–23

A snow storm affected the Northeast and Mid-Atlantic of the United States from February 21 onward. School closings, car accidents, and airport delays were reported in New York City. The FAA reported delays of up to 9 hours at LaGuardia Airport, and delays averaging 3–5 hours at JFK Airport. In total, almost 1,100 flights were cancelled at New York City's three major airports. In New York City,  fell, while in northern New Jersey, up to  accumulated.

Storm-related traffic accidents led to one death in Connecticut while in Missouri, where ice was the primary form of precipitation, 5 people were killed in accidents.

March

February 28 – March 2

A weak Alberta clipper intensified over eastern Canada after dumping about 10–17 cm over Ontario and Quebec and several areas of the Northeastern United States. It brought another major winter storm for New Brunswick and eastern Quebec. Gaspé, Quebec received about 55 cm of snow while portions of New Brunswick received 25–30 cm. Strong winds in excess of 100 km/h forced the closure of the Confederation Bridge linking New Brunswick and Prince Edward Island.

February 28 – March 7

A European windstorm passed through Central Europe, causing severe damage in Austria, the Netherlands, Germany, Eastern France, Poland, and the Czech Republic, leaving 16 people dead (8 Germans, 4 Czechs, 2 Austrians, 1 Frenchman and 1 Pole). Windstorm Emma  was a severe extratropical cyclone which passed through several mainly Central European countries, most devastatingly on Saturday March 1, 200, killing at least twelve people in Austria, Germany, Poland and the Czech Republic. Major infrastructure disruptions and some injuries were also reported in Belgium, France, Switzerland, and the Netherlands. Many trees were also bought down in SW British Isles as it passed over with winds at about 100 mph, affecting counties in Ireland, Wales and S. Western England. A Lufthansa jet almost crashed attempting to land in crosswinds at Hamburg. and almost crashed while landing in windy conditions near Hamburg.

March 3–5

A storm system attached to a strong front that give very warm temperatures across much of the eastern half of the continent, produced a significant winter storm for portions of Missouri and Arkansas with freezing rain across New York and Ohio. The low is expected to cross New England and give mixed precipitations for most of the Northeast as well as portions of Quebec and Ontario with heavier snow away from the Saint Lawrence River and the Lower Great Lakes.

The freezing rain affected parts of Ohio where presidential primaries were held but had little or no impact on the overall turnout. In Arkansas, where up to nearly one foot of snow fell locally, several schools were shut down in the western part of the state while other school closures were reported across the Midwest. About 8 to  fell in parts of Missouri and Michigan with localized amounts of thirteen inches (330 mm)  near the St. Louis area. The winter storm disrupted the schedule of several March Madness Tournament basketball games across the Midwest. Nearly 12 000 customers in Illinois also lost power during the storm.

Heavy snow and local ice pellets and freezing rain fell throughout much Eastern Canada with the heaviest snow from north of the Great Lakes to north of the Saint Lawrence River from Toronto to eastern Quebec. From  of snow fell with the highest amounts in the Ottawa area. The blizzard conditions also forced a one-day delay for a ceremony at CFB Trenton in memory of a Canadian soldier who was killed in Afghanistan.

March 5–9 

The snow on March 5 forced the cancellations of over 500 flights at the Dallas/Fort Worth International Airport, stranding thousands of travelers. As much as fell in the northeastern corner of Texas, an unusual depth for that region.

The storm continued northeastward through the Midwest and into the Ohio Valley. Ohio was the hardest-hit state, where near-blizzard conditions were experienced and 8–20 inches of snow fell, while nearby Indiana saw areas of over a foot of snow as well. Arkansas also saw localized totals of 12–18 inches. Snow fell as far south as northern Mississippi, where 5–8 inches fell, and in Tennessee and Kentucky, where localized totals over a foot were reported and Louisville saw its largest storm in a decade. A record  fell on Columbus, Ohio during the storm, mainly on the 8th, and 4 people have been killed in traffic accidents caused by the weather so far, with 1 in Ohio, 1 in Tennessee, and 2 in New York. On the 8th, the worst day for much of the Midwest and Ohio Valley, a plane skidded off the runway at Port Columbus International Airport, while near-blizzard conditions closed Cleveland Hopkins International Airport. Schools were closed across the state, delaying numerous high school sporting events (mainly basketball championships), while the University of Cincinnati men's basketball team was forced to delay its game with the University of Connecticut after being unable to catch a flight out of the state. Thousands of people also lost power during the storm.

The storm also hit hard across portions of Ontario and Quebec during the period dumping from 6 inches to as much as 21 inches of snow (15–52 cm). Strong winds in excess of 60 km/h with reports in excess of 100 km/h and thunder and lightning also accompanied the storm. Snow drifts forced several motorists to abandon their vehicles on some the Quebec major highways particular on Highway 15 and 30 near Montreal and also on a secondary highway near Quebec City.

Several inches of rain caused localized flooding along the I-95 corridor in the mid-Atlantic. In Florida, widespread severe weather, including approximately 15 tornadoes, was reported on March 7. One tornado near Lake City killed 2 people.

March 13–18

Newfoundland and Labrador and parts of Atlantic Canada including Nova Scotia were hit by a series of winter storms. Newfoundland and Labrador was particularly hit hard with three consecutive storms with heavy amounts of snow, strong winds, freezing rain. At one point Fogo Island was under a state of emergency after an avalanche caused by one of the storms isolated the area from the rest of the province. Properties and a bridge were damaged by the avalanche. On March 13–14, central parts of the provinces near Gander received as much as 50 centimeters. About 20 centimeters fell on March 16. On March 18, the Avalon Peninsula including St. John's received as much as 40 centimeters of snow and winds reached as high as 141 km/h in Cape Race in the southern part of the Peninsula. Freezing rain and rain later followed the heavy snow across those areas. Transit, banks, government buildings and Memorial University were all shut down while several roads were closed.

March 19–21

A major winter storm hit the eastern portions of Quebec during a two-day period bringing heavy snow and winds gusting in excess of 100 km/h across the Saguenay-Lac-Saint-Jean, Bas-Saint-Laurent and Côte-Nord regions creating blizzard conditions. Several roads including Highways 132, 138 and 185 were closed as did Autoroutes 20 and 85. Over 600 people were sheltered at schools and other shelters in Riviere-du-Loup. The roof of a school gymnasium in Maria, Quebec in the Gaspésie region collapsed under the weight of the heavy snow from the storm and previous snowfall and ice during the winter. At least one person was killed during the storm near Forestville

April

April 1–7
On April 1, Dust storms hit Astana in Kazakhstan.

A late season winter storm struck parts of eastern South Dakota, eastern North Dakota and northern Minnesota on April 5 – April 7. An area of low pressure formed along a stationary front draped over central Minnesota and moved slowly northeast. Fourteen inches (356 mm)  of snow fell in Hoover, South Dakota, and nearly  fell in Fargo, North Dakota. The heaviest snow fell in northern Minnesota with a wide swath of 18+ inch amounts reported.

April 9–12

A large storm system affected a large portion of the Central United States from April 9 to April 12. The storm produced strong winds to the south of it and dumped heavy snow to the north. Winter Storm watches and warnings were in effect from Colorado to Michigan, and Blizzard Warnings were in effect for parts of South Dakota, Iowa, Minnesota, Wisconsin and Michigan. Up to  fell across the eastern Dakotas and western Nebraska.

April 10–21

A series of mid-April winter storms affected much of the Canadian Plains after a below-average snowfall season for most areas. The city of Calgary and most of southern Alberta were hit by a surprising winter storm during the morning hours by a wave of precipitation that was not related to the winter storm the central portions of the continent. About 20–25 cm fell in a few hours bringing down power lines and causing 16 injuries due to motor vehicle accidents.  Snow also fell from the Rockies east towards central Saskatchewan. Many areas received over 20 cm with local reports of up to 60 cm shutting down several roads and producing dozens of collisions across several of the major Alberta highways. Accumulated snow even fell in Victoria, British Columbia where it broke a new April single-day record snowfall

April 24–27

A new system across the eastern Prairies dumped heavy amounts of snow from the eastern Dakotas to northwestern Ontario as well as southern Manitoba including Winnipeg from April 24 to April 27. Blizzard conditions during the early morning hours of April 26 shut down parts of the Trans-Canada Highway in southern Manitoba east of Winnipeg where  fell

May

April 30 – May 2

While a major tornado outbreak took place across the Central and Southern Plains as well in the lower Mississippi River Valley, the northern fringes of a strong low pressure system delivered a major blizzard across northeastern Wyoming and western South Dakota. The poor conditions forced the closure of Interstate 90 in the Black Hills region of western South Dakota.

May 8–9th
On May 8, dust storms hit Astana in Kazakhstan.
21 people had died in a rural Mongolian blizzard. Parts of the Chinese province of Inner Mongolia were also affected.

The Burmese government said that over 60,000 people are dead or missing and about 1,000,000 are homeless. The American embassy to Burma in the area has estimated that about 100,000 died when Cyclone Nargis hit coastal Myanmar on May 8 and 9, 2008.

May 26–27
Fifty-four people, including 14 children, died during a sudden snowstorm in eastern Mongolia, after the days before had been warm with temperatures around 25 degrees Celsius (77 °F). Additionally, around 200,000 head of livestock were lost in Khentii and Sükhbaatar alone. In Dornod, Sükhbaatar and Khentii, several meteorological stations broke down, causing a communication issue with the meteorological institute. Chinggis Khaan International Airport in Ulaanbaatar saw delayed flights.

June

June 1–2
About 52 people and 200,000 head of cattle had died in heavy blizzards by the 2nd in Mongolia.

August

August 5–16

The remaining low pressure zone was last notable on August 14 as it crossed the International Date Line, out of the Central Pacific Hurricane Center's area of responsibility. Shortly after crossing the dateline, the remnant low that had been Tropical Storm Kika (2008), entered the western Pacific basin and regenerated into a tropical depression. The meteorological depression continued to move towards the west southwest before dissipating on August 16 over open waters.

August 25
On the August 25, heavy dust storms  went over the eastern plains of Somalia and the northeast of a still drought hit northern Kenya.

September

September 14–16
On September 14 to 16, a major sandstorm covered an area between the cities of Baghdad, Mosul and Kirkuk. It had apparently started in on the Syrian/Iraq on the 14th and had spread in to neighbouring parts of Iran, Turkey and most of Syria by the 16th.

October

October 10–12
A huge early season storm began to develop over the Great Basin on the 10th and snowfall spread through the Idaho mountains and into Montana. It spread eastward through the rest of Montana and Wyoming throughout the 10th, bringing heavy snowfall to the northern High Plains and adjacent Rocky Mountains. Snow will fill in across Utah and Colorado on the 11th, and as the strong low pressure area moves northeast through Wyoming and into the High Plains, snow will once again intensify across those regions.

The mountains of Idaho, Montana, Wyoming, and Utah will see widespread totals of 1–2 feet of snow, with up to 4 feet in the mountains of south-central Montana and the Bighorn Mountains of Wyoming. Snow will fall to the valley floors across the region as well, bringing at least 4 inches to most mountain valley locations, with over 12 inches in some areas. On the High Plains, snow of 6–12 inches will occur from southern Saskatchewan through eastern Montana, western North and South Dakota, and eastern Wyoming. Amounts of 1–2 feet are possible in the far western High Plains region from approximately Billings to Sheridan. In addition, approximately 3–6 inches are expected in the valleys of eastern Idaho, northeastern Nevada, and western Utah, with locally greater totals downwind of the Great Salt Lake due to the lake-effect. The plateaus of southern Wyoming will see blizzard conditions, while the western mountains of Colorado will see up to a foot of snow. This storm is expected to be one of the largest storms to ever affect the region so early in the year.

October 29
The first snowfall in Eastern Canada dumped up to 15 cm of wet snow in Northwestern and southwestern Quebec and the neighboring regions of eastern Ontario, knocking electricity out for some 70,000 people and forcing the closure of several schools and school boards. The same depression also caused worries in Gaspésie due to rainfall. Portions of New York and Pennsylvania received as much as 1-foot of snow.

October 30
The First snowfall for the British Isles dumped around 20 cm of wet snow in parts of Devon and Buckinghamshire. Ireland was also affected with around 10 cm of snow.

November

November 5–7

A major winter storm affected portions of the northern Plains of North America from the Dakotas to Manitoba. Blizzard conditions across the Dakotas made travel nearly impossible with several roads shut down due to whiteout conditions and winds in excess of 60 mph. As much as 15 inches fell in North Dakota in Towner and Velva, while significant ice fell near the Red River and Devil's Lake areas. Lighter amounts was observed in South Dakota where at most 8 inches fell west of the state capital Pierre. In Manitoba, where 20 centimeters of snow fell, about 2,000 collisions were reported in and around the Winnipeg area.

November 18–22

The first major snowsquall event of the year occurred in Southern Ontario and parts of Michigan, Pennsylvania and New York. About 100 cm (1 metre) was recorded in some areas.

At the same time a coastal system produced a major snowstorm across the Canadian Maritimes shutting down many roads in Nova Scotia and New Brunswick. About 30 cm of snow fell in the Halifax area and about 20 in Moncton. Over 10,000 customers lost power during the storm. In another snow event during the week preceding the main storm about 1,500 motorists were stranded on the Cobequid Pass of Highway 104 in Nova Scotia.

November 19–24 (Europe)
A strong high ridge emanating from Greenland crossed Europe creating the first wintry conditions in the season. The ridge interacted over the Black sea with an extratropical cyclone, which later created high winds of 25 m/s (force 10, with gusts up to force 12 over Baltic sea) with snowfall over much of eastern and northeastern Europe. Disruptions in power supply, traffic, air traffic and shipping on the Baltic sea were widespread. The cyclone eventually filled over Estonia leaving about a foot of snow over much of the affected area.

November 25 – December 1

A large extratropical cyclone struck California late on November 25. Floods Watches and Warnings, Winter Storm Watches and Warnings were issued for California and Nevada. A flood advisory was in effect for Clark County and Winter Storm Warnings were in effects for the Serrria range. In Canada, Winter Storm Warnings and Snowfall Warnings are in effect, while in some areas it dumped 30 cm, and other areas saw only rain. Wiarton saw 30 cm, Barrie saw 10 cm and Toronto saw rain with mixing at times. Many delays at airports were reported like at Chicago's O'Hare Airport.

December

December 3–5

A winter storm is affecting portions of Ontario, Wisconsin, Illinois, and Michigan. In behind it, cold Arctic air is rushing in from the North, and temperatures are dropping rapidly. This is the first major cold wave of the season. The cold air mass has developed more snow squalls of the lakes, as much as 40 cm or more could fall in parts of Michigan and 30 cm or more near the snowbelt region of Ontario.

December 6 – December 7

Area's around the lakes could get more snow, because of enhancement off of the Lakes. The storm then affected the northeast with as much as 4 inches of snow, Major cities like New York, Boston, Philadelphia, Providence, Washington D.C., Pittsburgh, Buffalo, and Albany all got some type of snow accumulation. Chicago was hit by freezing air temps. At one point in Boston, 0.5 mile visibility was observed. Long Island, N.Y. had snow ranging from 1 inch in Islip, to 3.5 inches in Huntington. Temperatures continued to drop in the Northeast, with overnight temperatures in the low teens. States such as Indiana, Iowa, Minnesota, Missouri, Wisconsin, Michigan, Illinois, Ohio, Virginia, and all of the Northeast states were hit by this system with freezing air temperatures and snow accumulations.

December 7–8

A winter storm is affecting parts of Atlantic Canada. As much as 25–50 mm of rain could fall in Nova Scotia, Newfoundland and parts of New Brunswick. Northern Quebec could see 20–30 cm, with similar amounts in Labrador. Winds gusting over 100 km/h are quite possible, once the storm passes, with much colder temperatures. Many areas reported seeing strong gusty winds. Driving will be hazardous in many areas of the Atlantic provinces. As much as 20 cm was recorded in parts of Quebec, and Northern New Brunswick.

December 8–12 

A powerful Panhandle hook storm tracked across the Midwestern US, Great Lakes and eastern Canada regions where heavy snow fell from northern Iowa to eastern Quebec. Numerous winter storm, heavy snowfall and freezing rain warnings were issued.
Snowfall and mixed precipitation fell in parts of Michigan, Illinois, Ohio, Indiana, Wisconsin and Southern Ontario and Quebec and much of New Brunswick.

The Greater Toronto Area saw between 5 and 10 centimeters before the changeover to rain with local freezing rain particularly north and east of the city. Many areas of central, northeastern and eastern Ontario as well as southern received from 15 to 35 centimeters including 20 cm in the Montreal area and 30 cm in the Ottawa and surrounding region with a few hours of freezing rain from 9 pm to 1 am. The snow storm further complicated the commuters in the Ottawa area where a transit strike at OC Transpo started. About 20 centimeters was recorded in North Bay and up to 30 centimeters in and around the Cottage Country near the Parry Sound and Haliburton regions. There were over 100 crashes reported in Southern Ontario, because of icy conditions and snow.

In the US, up to 11–12 inches fell in Wisconsin, 14 inches in Michigan, 5 inches in northern Illinois and 7 inches in Iowa

The storm was also accompanied by heavy rain further south and severe storms which spawned tornadoes from the Alexandria, Louisiana area to near Birmingham, Alabama to west of Atlanta, Georgia. There were 36 reported tornadoes in an outbreak in the southern part of this storm. 33 of those tornadoes were confirmed with five of those EF2s, two in Mississippi, two in Alabama, and one in Louisiana with many destroyed homes, damaged buildings, and overturned cars. Many people were injured in the tornadoes. Other than the EF2s, many EF0s and EF1s were confirmed with damage in Texas, Oklahoma, Louisiana, Mississippi, Alabama, Arkansas, Florida, and Georgia. One EF0 tornado in Georgia was caught on film as it was hitting a high school, damaging it. The outbreak was one of the largest in the month of December.

A second storm, with a cold-core upper low, developed on December 11 behind the first one, and spread snow across parts of the Gulf Coast states including the cities of Houston, Texas, Baton Rouge, Louisiana and New Orleans, Louisiana as well as parts of southern Mississippi. Four inches fell in Lumberton and Beaumont in southeast Texas as well as just outside the Baton Rouge area and south central Louisiana. Some areas of west-central Louisiana received as much as 6 inches, while areas just south of Jackson, Mississippi received 8 to 10 inches. It was the first snowfall for the downtown New Orleans area since 2004 while its all-time snowfall record for one storm was 5 inches in December 1963. The winter weather caused local power outages in several parishes in Louisiana. It was also Houston's first snowfall since 2004.

While wintry precipitation was light and more scarce across the Tennessee Valley, a swath of freezing rain developed across the northeast, dumping heavy amounts of ice across most of New England. Up to one million customers lost electricity across the entire region due to the ice and high winds from northern New York to Maine. States of emergency were declared by the governors of Massachusetts, New Hampshire and New York.  Snowfall amounts topped 9 inches across parts of northern Vermont and New Hampshire. In the Maritime provinces of Canada, several hours of freezing rain were reported, followed by much warmer temperatures. Moncton, New Brunswick hit , which caused flooding.

December 12–17
A major winter storm affected the west coast with rain and snowfall as well as high winds. About 13 cm of snow fell in Vancouver, British Columbia on December 13, while about 20 cm fell in the interior of British Columbia. In behind the storm, a cold air mass developed over British Columbia and temperatures dropped well below the freezing mark for a daytime high even in cities like Vancouver and Victoria. The storm will affect the Canadian Prairies, and U.S. Prairies with blizzard like conditions, likely 10–20 cm could fall, with local amounts of 20 cm or more. The windchill could drop below −35 °C in southern Saskatchewan, and parts of Alberta and Manitoba. Windchill warnings have been posted for those areas. This is a major Arctic outbreak in Western Canada and U.S. Around the Great lakes, Wawa, Ontario saw , Thunder bay, Ontario saw , with lighter amounts away from the center. Southern Ontario saw rain, with strong winds Monday, taking down trees (Toronto reached winds of 40–60 km/h), it has cooled down in Southern Ontario, and parts of the U.S. Northeast. In the Maritime provinces, warmer weather is continuing, but by Tuesday everything will cool down.

December 16–17
A moderately harsh winter storm struck the Midwestern United States on December 16, dropping 3 to 5 inches of snow. In Southern Ontario, the Greater Toronto Area has seen 8–10 cm. With 10 cm in Barrie, and 11 cm in Windsor, Ontario. Heavier snow fell in Midwestern United States where as much as 15 cm or more was recorded. There were over 200 crashes in Southern Ontario, many of them because of careless driving. The storm is affected regions of Atlantic Canada, with 15 cm in Southern New Brunswick, with similar amounts in Newfoundland and Labrador.

A low pressure system moved northeastward from the Pacific Ocean in the Southwestern United States, along with arctic air produced  of snow in the Las Vegas Valley with Las Vegas receiving 1 to 4 inches and Henderson receiving , outer edges of the valley received up to a foot of snow. This was the largest snow event in the Las Vegas Valley in over 30 years. The deserts of California also saw a snow event with the same system. Barstow (a San Bernardino suburb) received  of snow.

December 17–19
A quick moving Colorado low, affected portions of the southwest, Midwestern US as well as parts of eastern Canada. Previously, the storm produced snow across the Pacific Northwest including the Seattle, Vancouver and Victoria area. Heavy snow affected parts of Wisconsin and Michigan dumping up to a foot of snow in the Milwaukee area heavily disrupting air traffic at General Mitchell International Airport NWS Milwaukee, December 20, 2008. Over a foot of snow was also reported locally around Oakland and Macomb Counties near Detroit. Most of southwestern Ontario, next in path of the storm received . The snow and blowing snow was the cause of a 25-car pile-up on Highway 400 north of Toronto injuring at least five. The storm also affected parts of New England still recovering from the previous week's ice storm that left over 1 million customers without power.

New York City saw several inches of snow before a change to freezing rain and then rain. Up to half of foot of snow is expected in Boston later this evening, before the storm pulls off the coast and strengthens further, effecting the Canadian maritimes as a winter mix of snow and freezing rain. During the storm's peak, as many as 1,000 flights were canceled across the northeast.

South of the snow band, a strong ice storm affected the states of Missouri, Iowa and Illinois. Ice accumulation was up to 1.25 inch in some parts of Illinois. Roads are very dangerous and hazardous. Interstates were covered in a sheet of thick ice. Many airports (including Chicago O'Hare) are experiencing cancellations and delays. Schools are also being canceled and delayed. About 300 delays were reported at Toronto's Pearson International Airport.

December 19–22

A winter storm formed off the Pacific coast before affecting the Midwest and Northeastern United States, later during the weekend, right around the Winter Solstice. The winter storm eventually absorbed another low from the north. Winter storm watches and blizzard warnings (not related to the previous storm) were issued from Washington to Maine, as the storm was expected to bring immediate blizzard conditions to parts of the West and Midwest, before affecting the Northeast on Sunday, December 21. The storm was expected to bring winds as high as 90 mph to parts of Washington, by Saturday, December 20.

In the West Coast, the powerful winter storm affected major cities. Vancouver, British Columbia, and the surrounding areas saw about 15–30 cm of snow, with higher amounts in the higher elevations of the city and on Vancouver Island. Also, in Vancouver, temperatures dropped to about -15 °C on December 20, setting an all-time daily low temperature for that day. Down south, towards Washington, 15–20 cm of snow also fell, with lighter amounts south of Seattle, WA. Many delays were reported at the major airports. Snowfall estimates for the Northeast on Sunday, December 21 currently range from estimates of 4–6 inches for New England to estimates of 5–10 inches in the Adirondacks by the National Weather Service. The storm brought 15 cm of snow to the Greater Toronto Area, with higher amounts towards Lake Huron, Georgian Bay, and the Niagara Region. This winter storm also brought strong winds, gusting to 90 km/h in some areas. The storm brought blizzard conditions, causing delays at the major airports. As much as 20–40 cm fell in New Brunswick, and a wintery mix in Nova Scotia and Newfoundland and Labrador. The winter storm also caused storm surges, with the brisk winds. Resultingly, warnings and watches were issued in the Atlantic provinces. In the Northeast US, some localized areas reported 60 cm of snow, with 30–50 cm in other areas. The storm cut the power to many people, most of them in the State of Maine.

December 22–25

A winter storm developed just off the West Coast, on December 22, becoming a major Winter storm after it moved northward into the U.S. Midwest, and the Great lakes region. The winter storm affected those regions from December 23 to Christmas Day on December 25. The Greater Toronto Area saw 10–15 cm of snow, London, Ontario about 20 cm, with 5 cm in Barrie, Ontario. Rain should followed, behind the snow, with 10–20 mm in Southern Ontario. The heavy rain and snow resulted in delays at many airports; at the O'Hare Airport, and Pearson International, on a busy travelling day (December 24) because of icy and slippery conditions. The storm also brought freezing rain and snow in the Atlantic Provinces, which eventually changed to rain before Christmas. Northern New Brunswick and Quebec saw mostly snow.

On the West Coast, there was about anywhere from 10–35 cm of snow in many areas of British Columbia, mostly along the coast towards Vancouver, which saw about 20–25 cm. Some of the hills/higher elevations in Metro Vancouver saw 30–35 cm of snow, and temperatures were still in the sub-zero range in all areas of the south coast from the December 14. Lesser amounts of snow fell in Victoria, British Columbia, and on Vancouver Island, with about 15 cm of snow in Victoria.

December 30, 2008 – January 1, 2009
An Alberta clipper affected the Great lakes region, the Midwestern United States, and the Northeastern United States. Greater Toronto Area saw about 7–10 cm, with higher amounts towards the Niagara region. After moving off the East Coast, the winter storm quickly began to strengthen over the Atlantic, becoming a blizzard. The Northeastern United States saw about 10–20 cm of snow. The Atlantic provinces were impacted by Blizzard conditions on New Year's Day, with 49 cm of snow recorded in Charlottetown, Prince Edward Island, and 25 cm of snow in Halifax, Nova Scotia. Blizzard warnings and storm surge warnings were issues, as sustained winds from the North exceeded . Newfoundland and Labrador saw about 15–25 cm of snow, with blowing snow. Another 15–20 cm fell in the Canadian province, as another low moved in.

Fatalities

See also

2008 Central Asia energy crisis
February 2009 Great Britain and Ireland snowfall
December 2008 North American snowstorms
December 2008 New England ice storm
East Asian snowstorms of late 2009
Global storm activity of 2006
Summer storms of 2009
Winter of 1946–47 in the United Kingdom
Winter of 1962–63 in the United Kingdom
Winter of 1990–91 in Western Europe
Winter of 2009–10 in Europe
Winter storm

References

2008 meteorology
2008 natural disasters
Blizzards
Ice storms
Weather events
Weather by year